Wugang may refer to the following places in China:

 Wugang, Henan (舞钢市), county-level city of Pingdingshan, Henan
 Wugang, Hunan (武冈市), county-level city of Shaoyang, Hunan
  (武岗镇), town in Quanjiao County, Anhui Province
  (五港镇), town in Lianshui County, Jiangsu Province
 Wugang dialect, an Old Xiang Chinese dialect in Wugang, Hunan, China
 Wugang Airport
 Wugang steel works

See also  
 Wukang (disambiguation)